The LAHAT (Laser Homing Attack or Laser Homing Anti-Tank, also a Hebrew word for incandescence) is a third generation semi-active laser homing guided low-weight anti-tank guided missile developed since 1991 and manufactured by Israel Aerospace Industries. It has a tandem-charge high-explosive anti-tank (HEAT) warhead. It was designed primarily to be fired by Merkava tanks' 105 mm and 120 mm tank guns, though it matches all types of 105 mm and 120 mm guns, including low recoil guns and low-weight guns of military armoured cars. 

It is also suitable for patrol ships, possibly modified for 105–106 mm recoilless rifles, unmanned aerial vehicles (UAVs), High Mobility Multipurpose Wheeled Vehicles (HMMWVs), and self-propelled anti-aircraft weapons (or guns: SPAAGs). Unlike other tank rounds, LAHAT does not need a tank gun for operation.

Overview

The LAHAT is designed to achieve a 95 percent probability of kill under most conditions. It has a semi-active laser guidance system, capable of both direct and indirect laser designation—the target can be laser-designated by the launching platform (e.g. firing tank) or other platform (e.g. another tank, helicopter, UAV, or forward scouting team), requiring minimal exposure in the firing position. With a low launch signature, the missile's trajectory can be set to match either top attack (armoured fighting vehicle, warship) or direct attack (helicopter gunship) engagements.

The LAHAT missile has a range of up to  when launched from a ground platform, and up to  when deployed from high elevation. In any tank, the LAHAT is stowed in the ammunition rack and handled otherwise like any other type of ammunition.

The LAHAT was renamed to Nimrod-SR for the Latin American market.

The United States military is considering using the LAHAT as a weapon to arm unmanned aerial vehicles. The missile has been tested on the IAI RQ-5 Hunter.

The LAHAT has been successfully test-fired from a helicopter in demonstrations. Firings were conducted while the helicopter was hovering, and moving, at targets that were fixed, and moving. One direct hit was scored using the helicopter's observation capability along with laser designation from ground forces.

See also
 List of gun-launched missiles
 SAMHO
 UMTAS
 9M119

References

External links

 LAHAT on IAI.co.il
 LAHAT (naval) on IAI.co.il
 LAHAT on SIGNAL Magazine
 LAHAT on Defense-update.com

Anti-tank guided missiles
Anti-tank guided missiles of Israel
IAI missiles
Military equipment introduced in the 1990s